Thimmakka may refer to:

 Saalumarada Thimmakka, an environmentalist from the state of Karnataka, India
 Timmakka, popular name of Tallapaka Tirumalamma, a famous 15th century Telugu poet